GT5 may refer to:
 Ginetta GT5 Challenge, an auto racing series
 Gran Turismo 5, a video game
 Gran Turismo 5 Prologue, a video game